Neocrionisca is a genus of fungus gnats in the family Ditomyiidae.

Species
N. collessi Papavero, 1977

References

Ditomyiidae
Sciaroidea genera